Ilya Olegovich Yablokov (born 29 September 2003) is a Russian figure skater. He is the 2019 European Youth Olympic Festival champion and a three-time Junior Grand Prix medalist, including gold at 2021 JGP Slovenia. He finished in the top ten at the 2020 World Junior Championships.

Personal life 
Yablokov was born on 29 September 2003 in Saint Petersburg. As of 2020, he is a high school student.

Career 
Yablokov began skating in 2007. He initially trained under Nadezhda Kondulinskaya and Alexander Shubin in Moscow, before later switching to Viktoria Butsaeva.

On the junior level internationally, Yablokov is the 2018 Christmas Cup, the 2019 Cup of Tyrol, and the 2019 European Youth Olympic Festival champion. Earlier, he won silver at the 2017 Cup of Tyrol. At the Russian Junior Championships, Yablokov placed 14th in 2018 and 10th in 2019.

2019–2020 season 
Yablokov received his first Junior Grand Prix assignments. At his first event, JGP Russia, he won bronze behind teammates Petr Gumennik and Artur Danielian as part of a Russian podium sweep. Yablokov was fourth at his second event in Italy, missing the podium by around eight points. As a result of his placements and by virtue of a tiebreaker, he was third alternate for the 2019–20 Junior Grand Prix Final.

Yablokov finished 11th at the 2020 Russian Championships in December after replacing Mikhail Kolyada, who was recovering from sinusitis. He sixth at the 2020 Russian Junior Championships in February and was subsequently named first alternate for the 2020 World Junior Championships team. Yablokov won senior bronze behind Makar Ignatov and Anton Shulepov at the Russian Cup Final at the end of February.

Yablokov was called up to replace Daniil Samsonov on the Junior Worlds team after Samsonov withdrew due to health issues. At the World Junior Championships, he was seventh after the short program but tenth in the free skating to finish tenth overall. Afterwards, Yablokov expressed that he was "extremely dissatisfied" with his performance at the event.

2020–2021 season 
Yablokov spent part of the offseason at a national team training camp in Sirius. He fell ill with a sore throat three weeks before Russian test skates and contracted a rotavirus infection upon arriving in Novogorsk for the test skates. Yablokov's coach, Viktoria Butsaeva cited his illnesses as part of their struggles to prepare adequately for the season but noted his junior bronze medal at the Moscow Championships in September was a turning point.

Due to the COVID-19 pandemic, the Junior Grand Prix, where Yablokov would have competed, was cancelled. However, after the Grand Prix series was converted into semi-domestic events, he was able to replace Alexander Samarin at 2020 Rostelecom Cup as the latter was still recovering from a back injury. At Rostelecom Cup, Yablokov was tenth in the short program and ninth in the free skating to finish ninth overall.

At the 2021 Russian Championships in December, Yablokov struggled with mistakes in both programs, finishing in 13th place. He reflected after the short program that he was "not very happy with [himself]," noting that he could usually perform the elements "well and consistently." Yablokov then competed at the 2021 Russian Junior Championships in February, finishing second in the short program, but made mistakes in the free skating to place sixth in the segment. He appeared to have won the bronze medal but fell to fourth after judges realized that competitor Egor Rukhin's quadruple Salchow was miscalled as a triple; Rukhin's score with the adjusted base value placed him about 1.5 points above Yablokov.

2021–2022 season 
With the resumption of international junior competition, Yablokov returned to the Junior Grand Prix at the 2021 JGP Slovakia, winning the silver medal. He went on to win a gold medal at the 2021 JGP Slovenia, qualifying for the 2021–22 Junior Grand Prix Final, but the latter event was cancelled as a result of concerns prompted by the Omicron variant. He was fifteenth at the 2021 CS Warsaw Cup at the senior level.

At the 2022 Russian Championships, Yablokov finished in fourteenth place.

Programs

Competitive highlights 
GP: Grand Prix; CS: Challenger Series; JGP: Junior Grand Prix

Detailed results 
ISU Personal best in bold.

Senior results

Junior results

References

External links 
 

2003 births
Living people
Russian male single skaters
Figure skaters from Saint Petersburg